Bheela Gulab Singh is a town and union council of Depalpur Tehsil in the Okara District of Punjab Province, Pakistan. It is located at 30°43'0N 74°4'0E.

References

Union councils of Okara District